Demichev (Russian: Демичев) is a Russian masculine surname originating from the verb demit (to cheat); its feminine counterpart is Demicheva. The surname may refer to the following notable people:
Mikhail Demichev (1885–1937), Red Army division commander
Pyotr Demichev (1918–2010), Soviet and Russian politician

References

Russian-language surnames